The Northern New Brunswick and Seaboard Railway can lay claim to be the railway company with the fewest miles of standard gauge track in history.  The province empowered it in 1904 to lay track between Nepisiguit Junction and Grand Falls, a distance of 26 kilometers, to serve the Drummond Iron Mines,<ref
name=mcc125></ref> which were discovered in 1897 by William Hussey. By 1903 the Austin Brook Iron Mine was formed, and operated under the name Drummond until 1913, when it went bust. It was in receivership for some short time until the Dominion Steel and Coal Company purchased the right to operate the mine from Canadian Iron Industries, who held the lease. Between 1920 and 1926, the construction of the Grand Falls hydroelectricity dam and plant required twice-daily return trips with a steam locomotive. Thereafter, a gasoline-powered jitney, trolly or automobile with steel wheels would serve, until in the early 1950s the Brunswick Mine attracted attention once again to the area. In 1955 a highway was pushed through to the mine site, and two years later the rails were sold for scrap.

References

Bibliography
 

Canadian National Railway subsidiaries
Defunct New Brunswick railways
Rail transport in New Brunswick
New Brunswick railways
Passenger railways in New Brunswick
Railway companies established in 1904
Railway companies disestablished in 1955
1904 establishments in New Brunswick
1955 disestablishments in New Brunswick